Calosso is a rural comune (municipality) in the Province of Asti in the Italian region Piedmont, located about  southeast of Turin and about  south of Asti in the hilly area between  the Tanaro and Belbo and on the borders between Monferrato and Langa.

The comune borders the following municipalities: Agliano Terme, Canelli, Castiglione Tinella, Costigliole d'Asti, Moasca, and Santo Stefano Belbo.

The village itself, together with its castle, stands on a hill surrounded by the vineyards which represent its principal economic activity.

Local government

The comune belongs to the Comunità delle colline tra Langa e Monferrato.

Viticulture
Around two thirds of the area of the commune, and by far the greatest part of its agricultural land is devoted to vineyards.

The principal grape variety grown here is the Moscato Bianco, while others include Barbera, Dolcetto, Nebbiolo, Chardonnay and Freisa. Of particular interest is the cultivation of the now rare historical variety Gamba di Pernice (literally ‘Pheasant’s leg’).

Demographic evolution

References

External links
 www.comune.calosso.at.it/

Cities and towns in Piedmont